Pedro Rodolfo Martínez  (born 18 October 1963) is a Paraguayan professional golfer.

Martinez was born in Asunción and turned pro in 1985.

Martinez played on the European Tour in 2000 and 2001, and achieved two top ten finishes the first season, tied 3rd in the Brazil São Paulo 500 Years Open and tied 6th in the Moroccan Open after leading after the first two rounds.

Martinez won the South American Tour Order of Merit in 1996, and the Pacific Tour Ranking (Chile) in 1996 and 1997.

Professional wins

Chile wins (8)
1989 Country Club Open
1992 Prince of Wales Open
1994 Viña del Mar Open
1995 Sports Frances Open
1996 Marbella Open
1997 Santo Domingo Open
2005 Viña del Mar Open
2008 Viña del Mar Open

Argentine wins (5)
1988 North Open
1990 Jockey Club Rosario Open
1996 Argentine Open
1998 Metropolitan Championship
2000 Norpatagonico Open

Other wins (8)
1990 Brazil Open
1991 Paraguay Open
1993 Los Inkas Peru Open
1995 Calaway Cup (Paraguay), Farallones Open (Paraguay)
1996 La Sabana Open (Colombia)
2000 LG Panama Masters
2006 El Rodeo Open (Colombia)

Team appearances
Alfred Dunhill Cup (representing Paraguay): 1991, 1998
World Cup (representing Paraguay): 1993, 1994, 1998, 1999

References

External links

Paraguayan male golfers
1963 births
Living people
20th-century Paraguayan people